Emmanuel Odarkwei Obetsebi-Lamptey (26 April 1902 – 29 January 1963) was a political activist in the British colony of the Gold Coast. He was one of the founding fathers of Ghana and one of the founders and leaders of the United Gold Coast Convention (UGCC) known as "The Big Six". He was the father of NPP politician Jake Obetsebi-Lamptey.
He played a vital role in the Big Six. He was recognized for his leadership, he was bold, confident and inspired his people to have hope.
His leadership role being played well brought a change to the political, economical and social standards required to pronounce Ghana as an independent country from its colonial masters.

Early life 

He was born on 26 April 1902 at a Ga village near Ode, a suburb of Accra. His father was Jacob Mills Lamptey, a businessman, and his mother was Victoria Ayeley Tetteh. His step-brother was Gottlieb Ababio Adom (1904–1979), an educator, journalist, editor and Presbyterian minister who served as the Editor of the Christian Messenger, the newspaper of the Presbyterian Church of Ghana, from 1966 to 1970.

Education 

He graduated LL.B., and was called to the Bar at the Inner Temple in 1939. By then, World War II (1939–45) had begun, to which he stayed and worked in England.

Personal life 
Emmanuel Obetsebi-Lamptey initially married a Dutch woman, Margaretha, with whom he had two sons: Jake Obetsebi-Lamptey (a New Patriotic Party politician, television and radio producer and advertising businessman) and Nee Lamkwei Afadi Obetsebi-Lamptey.

Obestebi-Lamptey later married a Ga woman, Augustina Akuorko Cofie (17 December 1923 – 14 November 2019), younger twin daughter of William Charles Cofie and Irene Odarchoe.  She was a co-founder of the Gold Coast Women's Association and a former tutor at the Accra Methodist Girls School from 1947 to 1953. In 1970, she became the first Ghanaian woman to be appointed envoy to Liberia. In the Greater Accra Region, she was involved in philanthropy in the women's prisons. Obetsebi-Lamptey had two children with Cofie, Nah-Ayele and Nii Lante.

Legacy 

There is a roundabout on the Ring Road West in Accra named after him.

References

See also 
 The Big Six
 United Gold Coast Convention
 Jacob Otanka Obetsebi-Lamptey

1902 births
1963 deaths
United Gold Coast Convention politicians
Ga-Adangbe people
Ghanaian Freemasons
20th-century Ghanaian lawyers
People from Accra
Ghanaian independence activists